Gracixalus jinxiuensis, commonly known as the Jinxiu bubble-nest frog or Jinxiu small treefrog, is a species of shrub frog from northern Vietnam and southern China (southeastern Yunnan, northeastern Guangxi and southern Hunan). "Jinxiu" in its names refers to the Jinxiu Yao Autonomous County, where its type locality lies. This species in known from forests, montane forests, secondary growth, forest edges, and from near streams.

Cryptic species
Gracixalus jinxiuensis, as currently defined, may in fact include more than one species. Furthermore, it is possible that some records refer to other, established  Gracixalus species. For instance, Gracixalus quyeti from Quảng Bình Province was formerly assigned to Gracixalus jinxiuensis.

Morphology

References

jinxiuensis
Amphibians described in 1978
Amphibians of Vietnam
Amphibians of China